Souvik Das (born 23 August 1995) is an Indian professional footballer who plays as a central midfielder for Rajasthan United in the I-League.

Career
Born in Kalyani, West Bengal, Das was a part of the youth U-19 India Elite Academy side and also a part of Sporting Goa. He was promoted to the senior squad for the 2016–17 Goa Pro League.

On 13 January 2017, Das made his professional debut for Minerva Punjab in the I-League against Aizawl. He started and played the full match despite Minerva Punjab losing 1–0.

International
Das has represented and captained India at the under-19 level.

Career statistics

Club

References

External links 
 
 

1995 births
Living people
People from West Bengal
Indian footballers
Sporting Clube de Goa players
RoundGlass Punjab FC players
Association football midfielders
Footballers from Kolkata
Goa Professional League players
I-League players
India youth international footballers
Sudeva Delhi FC players